Central Prison, Bangalore (also called Bangalore Central Jail and Parappana Agrahara Central Prison) is the largest prison in the Indian state of Karnataka. Established in 1997, it became the central prison of Bangalore in 2000 when the old jail, which has since been converted to Freedom Park, was shut for renovation.

As of October 2016, the prison is spread over 40 acres and has more than 4,400 inmates despite its capacity being only 2,200.

Notable inmates
Sanjjanaa Galrani – actress, accused in Sandalwood drug racket case
Ragini Dwivedi – actress, accused in Sandalwood drug racket case

References 

Prisons in India
1997 establishments in Karnataka